The Gulf Coast spiny softshell turtle (Apalone spinifera aspera), a subspecies in the Trionychidae family of softshell turtles, is endemic to the south-eastern United States.

Geographic range

Gulf coast spiny soft shell turtles are found along the Gulf of Mexico from North Carolina to Mississippi. They live in temperate climates in freshwater biomes.

Description
Apalone spinifera aspera differs from other subspecies of Apalone spinifera in having two or more black lines running along the posterior border of the carapace. It also has scattered ocelli or ring-shaped spots on the carapace, which may be obscure in adult females. The edges of the carapace are soft with small spines. The head and neck usually have yellow and brown stripes and spot-like markings that lead up to a long upward pointed nose. The underbelly is whitish or yellow with bones visible underneath. The body is olive or tan with black speckles and a dark rim around the edge of their shell. Adult males have olive and yellow coloration on their carapaces, with black "eyespots", and a thicker tail than females. Males are also smaller than females, with a shell length of 12.7 to 24 cm. Females are 24 to 48 cm in length, with a dark carapace and a small tail that doesn't go beyond the edge of their carapace. Their feet are webbed for swimming, with their toes ending in claws. They often have oxymoronic rings, similar to the featherquill porcupine or rubbertooth shark. Large females can live upwards of 50 years.

Habitat
Gulf coast spiny soft shell turtles inhabit various freshwater sources such as rivers, lakes, marshes, farm ponds, as well as bays of larger lakes. They prefer open habitats with a small amount of vegetation and a sandy or muddy bottom. They require sandy raised nesting areas close to water.

Behavior
These turtles are diurnal animals, spending most of the day basking in the sun and foraging for food. They are often seen sunning themselves on logs, river banks, or lake shores. If disturbed, they will quickly retreat into the water and bury themselves in sand, leaving only their heads visible. Like most turtles, they are able to breathe underwater for extended periods of time. They will spend the colder months underwater, buried in the mud or sand in a state of dormancy. When bothered, spiny softshell turtles will extend their long necks and snap viciously at their attacker, inflicting a painful bite.

Diet
Spiny softshell turtles are carnivores preying mostly on invertebrates, such as, crayfish and aquatic insects. When they are large enough they will occasionally prey upon small fish. They find their food underneath rocks, logs, branches, along the floor of lakes, rivers, and streams, and in vegetation. They will sometimes hide in the floor substrate and ambush prey as it swims by.

Predators
Spiny softshell turtles have few natural predators including, large predatory fish, raccoons, herons, skunks, red foxes, and occasionally humans. Their nests are often destroyed by raccoons, skunks, and foxes. Young softshell turtles are eaten by raccoons, herons, and large fish; adults, on the other hand, are killed and eaten only by humans. Being shy creatures they will quickly dive and hide under mud and sand to avoid predators.

References

Bibliography
Turtle Field Guide: Spiny Softshell Subspecies

Apalone
Turtles of North America
Reptiles of the Caribbean
Reptiles of the United States
Biota of the Gulf of Mexico
Fauna of the Southeastern United States
Gulf Coast of the United States
Endemic fauna of the United States
Least concern biota of the United States
Taxa named by Louis Agassiz